The Stanislaus State Warriors (also Stan State Warriors and Cal State Stanislaus Warriors) are the athletic teams that represent California State University, Stanislaus, located in Turlock, California, in NCAA Division II intercollegiate sports. The Warriors compete as members of the California Collegiate Athletic Association for all 13 varsity sports.

Championships

Appearances 
The Stanislaus State Warriors have competed in the NCAA Tournament across 13 active sports (6 men's and 7 women's) 98 times at the Division II level.

Team 

Stanislaus State won 14 national championships at the NCAA Division III level.

 Baseball (2): 1976, 1977
 Men's golf (12): 1976, 1977, 1978, 1979, 1980, 1981, 1984, 1985, 1986, 1987, 1988, 1989

Individual 

Stanislaus State had 11 Warriors win NCAA individual championships at the Division II level.

At the NCAA Division III level, Stanislaus State garnered 12 individual championships.

References

External links